This is a list of the busiest commercial airports in Italy by number of passengers. Annual data are linked from an Assaeroporti (Association of Italian Airport Management Companies) Web page.

Charts

Italy

Sardinia

Sicily

2020

2019

2018

2017

2016

2015

2014

2013

2012

2011

2010

References

Italy
Busy
Airports, Busy
Italy